Indiana Limestone Company Building, also known as Bedford College Center Building, is a historic building located at Bedford, Lawrence County, Indiana. It was built in 1927, and is a two-story, "L"-shaped, Classical Revival style limestone building on a raised basement.  It was built to house the offices and showroom of the Indiana Limestone Company, supplier of Indiana Limestone, founded in 1926. The building presently houses the Bedford branch of Oakland City University.

It was listed in the National Register of Historic Places in 1993.

References

Commercial buildings on the National Register of Historic Places in Indiana
Neoclassical architecture in Indiana
Commercial buildings completed in 1927
Buildings and structures in Lawrence County, Indiana
National Register of Historic Places in Lawrence County, Indiana
Limestone buildings in the United States
Limestone industry